The Gorillas (originally named The Hammersmith Gorillas) were an English rock group from Hammersmith, London, formed in 1972 and fronted by Jesse Hector, that played high energy rock music.

History
Jesse Hector (born in 1947, in Kilburn, northwest London) played in bands from the age of 11, first the Rock and Roll Trio, and then the R&B-influenced band the Cravats. Cravats bassist Adrian Stambach joined mod outfit the Clique in 1963. Hector reformed the Rock and Roll Trio before starting two more short-lived bands, the Way of Life and the Mod Section, and went on to form the proto-punk band Crushed Butler in 1969 with drummer Darryl Read and bassist Alan Butler. After a brief flirtation with EMI Records, the band was renamed Tiger, until Darryl left to join the glam rock group Dizzy, then they changed name again to Helter-Skelter. With the addition of drummer Gary Anderson, the band became the Hammersmith Gorillas, taking their name from London's pro-Castro activist group the Hammersmith Guerillas. 

The band's debut release was a cover version of the Kinks' "You Really Got Me" on the Penny Farthing label, produced by Larry Page, and timed to coincide with the tenth anniversary of the original release. They then signed to Chiswick Records, recording two singles for the label, and building a loyal fanbase, before moving on to Raw Records. In 1976, they played at the Mont-de-Marsan Punk Festival in the south of France along with the Damned and Eddie and the Hot Rods. After two more singles in 1978, the band's debut (and only) studio album was issued, Message to the World. 

Hector was noted for his extravagant sideburns, and was a keen self-publicist, declaring the Gorillas to be "the future of rock music". He was influenced by several dead rock stars, and several tracks on the band's album were performed in the style of his heroes, including a cover of Jimi Hendrix's "Foxy Lady" and "Going Fishing" performed in the style of Marc Bolan. They returned to Chiswick in the early 1980s for the "Move It" single, before splitting up after Butler died from injuries sustained in a horse riding accident. Hector continued to regularly perform live around London, working with a new band, Jesse Hector & The Sound, in the early 1990s, with bassist Kevin White and drummer Gilles Baillarguet. The band issued a single in 1991, "Leavin' Town" on the Clawfist label. When the group split in 1993, Hector assembled a new band, the Gatecrashers, named after a Gorillas single, contributing to several retro-garage rock compilations and releasing an EP in 2000, Keep on Moving. 

Later Hector worked as a cleaner at the Royal Geographical Society, and was the subject of a documentary film in 2008, A Message To The World, directed by Caroline Catz, which was shown as part of the Raindance festival, and at the Barbican as part of its "Pop Mavericks" season.

Discography

Singles 
"You Really Got Me" (1974) Penny Farthing (as the Hammersmith Gorillas)
"She's My Gal" (1976) Chiswick
"Gatecrasher" (1976) Chiswick
"You Really Got Me" (1977) Raw
"It's My Life" (1978) Raw
"Message to the World" (1978) Raw
"Move It" (1981) Chiswick

Albums 
Message to the World (1978) Raw (reissued with bonus tracks, 1998, Damaged Goods)
Gorilla Got Me (1999) Big Beat (credited to the Hammersmith Gorillas)

Gorillas tracks are also included on the Jesse Hector retrospective collection Gorilla Garage: The Jesse Hector Story (2005) RPM Records.

Crushed Butler's recordings were compiled by Darryl Read on the Uncrushed album in 2005 by RPM Records.

References

External links 
Lamey, Charles P. "The Gorillas", Trouser Press
Gottschalk, Alex "Hammersmith Gorillas", Punk77

English rock music groups
Musical groups established in 1974
Protopunk groups
British pub rock music groups
Chiswick Records artists